Johanne Cathrine Krebs (21 April 1848 - 1 April 1924) was a Danish painter and women's rights activist. She was known for her portrait painting. She was active in establishing the women's department of the Royal Danish Academy of Fine Arts.

Biography
Krebs was born in Byrum, Denmark . Her father was friends with the painters P. C. Skovgaard (1817–1875) and Johan Thomas Lundbye (1818-1848) sparking her interest in painting. She became a student of P.C. Skovgaard  from 1869 and 1871. At that time she was unable to enroll in the Royal Danish Academy of Fine Arts  (Kongelige Danske Kunstakademi). 

In early 1888 Krebs wrote an article for the Danish newspaper Politiken, stating that the existing, private Danish Women's Society's  School for Women  (Tegneskolen for Kvinders)  was not a substitute for admitting women to the Royal Danish Academy of Fine Arts.
 

By late 1888 the Art Academy's Art School for Women (Kunstakademiets Kunstskole for Kvinder)  opened, allowing women access to instruction at the Academy.  She and  Augusta Dohlmann (1847-1914) were considered to have been the leaders  in this movement. From 1888-1908,  she held the position as the school's inspectorate. 

From 1880 through 1895, Krebs exhibited at the Charlottenborg Spring Exhibition. From 1891 through 1924 she exhibited at the   Free Exhibition (Den Frie Udstilling)  of which she was a co-founder.
 

Krebs  exhibited her work at the Palace of Fine Arts at the 1893 World's Columbian Exposition in Chicago, Illinois, and in 1900 at the Exposition Universelle, where she received a bronze medal. 
 
She died in Copenhagen on 1 April 1924.

References

External links

images of Johanne Cathrine Krebs's paintings on artNET

1848 births
1924 deaths
19th-century Danish women artists
19th-century Danish painters
20th-century Danish women artists
20th-century Danish artists
20th-century Danish painters
Danish women's rights activists
People from the North Jutland Region